Sir Edward Charles Buck, KCSI (1838 – 6 July 1916) was a British civil servant who served in the Indian Civil Service and came to be known as the "Grand Old Man" of Indian agriculture.

Family and education

Buck was the son of Zechariah Buck, organist and master of the choristers at Norwich Cathedral for 58 years, and his second wife, Lucy Holloway. He was educated in Norwich and at Oakham School and later studied at Clare College, Cambridge, receiving a Bachelor of Laws (LL.B.) degree in 1862. In 1886, he was awarded an honorary Doctor of Law (LL.D.) degree, and in 1898 he became an honorary Fellow of Clare College.

His nephew, Sir Edward John Buck (1862-1948), was for many years a Reuters correspondent in India.

Career

Buck joined the Bengal Civil Service and served in the agricultural department of the North-Western Provinces from 1875 to 1880 before becoming a secretary to the Revenue and Agricultural Department in 1882, succeeding Allan Octavian Hume. 

Along with Lockwood Kipling and others he was involved in the promotion of arts, including the use of photography for documentation. He was also involved in nearly shutting down the Archaeological Survey of India. 

He was keen outdoorsman and one of his hobbies was "to plunge with a native hunter into a Himalayan forest, which he would penetrate before the dawn of day". From 1882 to 1896 he resided at The Retreat in Mashobra, sharing it for some years with Courtenay Ilbert and also with Earl Roberts when he was Commander-in-Chief. The property was later purchased by the Government for use by the Viceroy of India.

Recognition and later life

For his contribution to agriculture in India, Buck came to be called the "Grand Old Man" of Indian agriculture. In recognition of his efforts to make the land revenue system more efficient, he was knighted in 1886 and made a Knight Commander of the Order of the Star of India (KCSI) in 1897. 

He retired in 1897, though in 1905 he served as a delegate to the International Agricultural Conference in Rome. He died at Shimla in 1916.

References

External links 
 Indo-Anglian Literature (1883) (a privately published collection of humorous British Indian letters)

1838 births
1916 deaths
People from Norwich
People educated at Oakham School
Alumni of Clare College, Cambridge
Knights Commander of the Order of the Star of India
Indian Civil Service (British India) officers
Knights Bachelor